Jónína Kristín Berg (born 3 September 1962) is an Icelandic art teacher, aromatherapist and neopagan leader. She is the regional gothi of the Western Region for Ásatrúarfélagið since 1996 and acted as interim allsherjargoði in 2002-2003.

Biography 
She was born in Akranesi and grew up in Giljahlíð in Flókadal, Borgarfjörður. She was educated at the Reykjavík School of Visual Arts, from 1985 at the Icelandic Academy of Fine Arts and Crafts where she completed her degree in 1989, then studied at the school's graphic department until 1990, after which she studied at the Reykjavík University where she completed her teaching degree. She has also studied massage and essential oil therapy at Lífsskólann – Aromatherapyskóla Íslands from which she graduated in 2002. She has worked with individual training for disabled people in Kópavogur, but since 2004 lives in Borgarnes where she works as a primary school art teacher. She has also participated in group exhibitions with her own art. She performs aromatherapy and has served on the Board of Icelandic Healers.

She followed Ásatrúarfélagið from its inception as she was a neighbour of the co-founder Sveinbjörn Beinteinsson. She became active in the organization in 1985. In 1993 she was elected as a board member. Since 1994 she is responsible for annual blóts in Snæfellsnes and Borgarfjörður and since 1996 she is the regional gothi of the Western Region.

In 2002 she became the interim allsherjargoði after a conflict resulted in Jörmundur Ingi Hansen's removal from the office. She was succeeded by Hilmar Örn Hilmarsson in 2003 after a regular election could be held.

She has legal rights to perform marriages.

References 

1962 births
Living people
Icelandic modern pagans
Modern pagan religious leaders
Art educators
Folk healers
Adherents of Germanic neopaganism